Cory Mills (born July 13, 1980) is an American businessman, defense contractor, and politician serving as a member of the United States House of Representatives for  since 2023. A member of the Republican Party, he worked in various organizations as a security specialist and a business executive before being elected to Congress in 2022.

Early life and education 
Mills was born in Winter Haven, Florida. He earned an associate of arts degree in liberal arts and sciences from Florida State College at Jacksonville, followed by a Bachelor of Science degree in health sciences and a Master of Arts in international relations and conflict resolution from American Military University.

Career 
From 1999 to 2004, Mills served in the United States Army, where he was a member of the 82nd Airborne Division and worked security as a member of the conventional Army to support the Joint Special Operations Command Task Force in the Iraq War but was not Special Forces qualified. Mills never received any Special Forces qualifications in the military, although he has subsequently made references that seem to imply he was a member of the Special Operations Community. From 2005 to 2009, he was a security specialist for DynCorp. In 2010, he worked as a maritime security specialist and anti-piracy advisor for Special Tactical Services. Mills worked as a security manager for Chemonics from 2010 to 2011 and as a senior risk manager at Management Systems International in 2011. He joined Pax Mondial LLC in 2011 and later worked as the organization's director of the information operations division and senior vice president.

In 2020 and 2021, Mills served as a member of the Defense Business Board. He is the co-founder of ALS Less-Lethal Systems, a company that manufactures equipment for military and law enforcement clients. He also co-founded and is executive director of PACEM Defense, a private security company.

U.S. House of Representatives

Elections

2022 

Murphy's seat was a target for the National Republican Congressional Committee in the 2022 elections; however, following her retirement announcement in December 2021, the seat became open. Mills faced a crowded primary with his strongest opponent being state representative Anthony Sabatini, with whom he would narrowly overcome in polls. Mills won the primary election in August 2022, earning over a third of the vote and leading Sabatini by over 10,000 votes. Mills defeated his opponent, Democratic nominee Karen Green, in the November general election with 58.5% of the vote.

Tenure 
Mills handed out commemorative 40 mm grenades stamped with the Republican Party logo to fellow House members as a welcoming gift.

Syria 
In 2023, Mills was among 47 Republicans to vote in favor of H.Con.Res. 21 which directed President Joe Biden to remove U.S. troops from Syria within 180 days.

Committee assignments 
 Committee on Armed Services
 Committee on Foreign Affairs

Electoral history

References

External links 
 Congressman Cory Mills official U.S. House website
 Campaign website
 
 

|-

1980 births
Florida Republicans
Florida State College at Jacksonville alumni
Living people
People from Winter Haven, Florida
Republican Party members of the United States House of Representatives from Florida
United States Army personnel of the Iraq War
United States Army soldiers